The AFCA Supportersclub is an independent and official supporters' association linked to AFC Ajax football club, based in Amsterdam, Netherlands.

The groups administration and financial structure is completely separate from that of the football club, which allows the group to fully dedicate themselves to the interest of the clubs' supporters without there being any conflict of interest. The group is particularly dedicated to preserving the Ajax traditions, taking a stand on topics such as the club appearance, the integration of youth players and have been particularly aggressive in the restoration of the former Ajax logo.

Together with the SVA (Supportersvereniging Ajax), the organization has officially been recognized by Ajax as the clubs' second supporters group, since their integration into the supporters structure in 2006.

History
Founded on 31 August 1999 as the Onafhankelijke Fanclub Ajax (OFA) the fan club became an official supporters club of AFC Ajax on 10 October 2006, after the group merged with the Ajax Supporters Delegatie (ASD) to form the AFCA Supportersclub after representatives of the group attended a board meeting that same day. The newly formed AFCA Supportersclub would give the club supporters a more solid ground from which to express their views and an organization to discuss matters of interest pertaining to both parties, such as the collective influence surrounding the atmosphere in the Stadium during home matches. With a reported 42,000 members the Supportersclub hold a degree of influence in matters pertaining to the club, and were even able to introduce honorary club member Ronald Pieloor as an official member of the board at AFC Ajax, giving the group a voice to address the supporters needs within the scope of actual team affairs.

Supporters Advisory Committee
The Supporters Advisory Committee (SAC) (Dutch: Supporters Advies Commissie) is an initiative by Axios, the AFCA Supportersclub and the SVA (Supportersvereniging Ajax). The committee provide advise and support in disputes with the KNVB, if one has been wrongfully banned from a Stadium due to past incidences, the SAC can help to provide a neutral standpoint without being affected by the outcome. Many supporters are often overwhelmed by the many rules and regulations of the ruling committee over football in the Netherlands, and the SAC help to bring clarity to any given situation.

Supporters who have been banned can appeal the ban with the aid of the AFCA according to the KNVB Guidelines for Stadium bans '13/'14, after sufficient support has been provided and the supporter has expressed his remorse regarding previous actions, the SAC will then testify to AFC Ajax who can then decide on whether or not to appeal the ban and enroll the supporter in the KNVB forgiveness program. Supporters with bans exceeding the three year limit are exempt from the SAC.

Events
The AFCA Supportersclub have been responsible for several fundraisers for various causes, and organize various events, including indoor/outdoor sporting events, such as the famed Para Smit Tournament.

AFCA are also largely responsible for organizing the commute to away matches for the various support groups such as F-side and VAK410, as well nationally as for continental away matches, such as for the UEFA Champions League for example.

Geef Ajax z'n gezicht terug!
Geef Ajax z'n gezicht terug! (English: Give Ajax his face back!) was a widespread campaign which was launched by the organization during the 2013-14 Eredivisie season, requesting to have the face of Ajax returned to the team crest by reverting to the logo which was in use prior to the current one.  Posters appeared everywhere in Amsterdam with the catchphrase "Give Ajax his face back", with the campaign even finding its way into prominent Dutch media with significant news coverage, the group were able to collect a vast number of signatures in support of the logo change.

Ajax Supportershome
The AFCA are responsible for the upkeep as well as various events which take place at the official Ajax Supportershome located right outside the Amsterdam Arena. The building is completely covered in graffiti pertaining to the history and imagery of the club, made by various CBS (Can't Be Stopped) members, a famed graffiti crew from Amsterdam associated with the AFCA Supportersclub

At 3:30AM on Friday morning of 23 January 2015, the Ajax Supportershome was set on fire and burned to the ground, two days ahead of the Klassieker match against arch rivals Feyenoord. The building was completely destroyed, damage which included a large collection of art and memorabilia of the club, from the late honorary member Bobby Haarms and a large collection of shirts of past players were all destroyed in the fire.

A few days later the fire department ruled the fire as a result of arson, with the police releasing a video showing two men entering the supporters home, and evading the burning building. It was the second time the building had been set on fire, when supporters of ADO Den Haag had previously set fire to it in 2005. In the aftermath of the fire, various former Ajax players such as Klaas-Jan Huntelaar, John Heitinga, Hedwiges Maduro, Wesley Sneijder and Patrick Kluivert donated shirts and memorabilia for the new supporters home, while the RSCA Supportersclub of RSC Anderlecht in Belgium started a fund raiser to help the club, since the supporters of both clubs have kept close ties for many years.

Honorary members
The AFCA Supportersclub currently have two honorary club members.
  Bobby Haarms
  Ronald Pieloor

Board and Staff
The board consists of the following members:
Chairman: Seal
Secretary: Sander 
Treasurer: Antoinette
Board member Supporters Policy: Bert-Jan
Board member Legal Affairs: Ric
Board member General Affairs: Joost

All functions on the board and staff of the organization are completely voluntary and unpaid.

See also
 Ajax Business Associates
 Supportersvereniging Ajax

References

External links
AFCA Supportersclub official website 
Ajax Supportershome official website 

AFC Ajax
Dutch football supporters' associations